Eleanor Louise Greenwich (October 23, 1940 – August 26, 2009) was an American pop music singer, songwriter, and record producer. She wrote or co-wrote "Da Doo Ron Ron", "Be My Baby", "Maybe I Know", "Then He Kissed Me", "Do Wah Diddy Diddy", "Christmas (Baby Please Come Home)", "Hanky Panky", "Chapel of Love", "Leader of the Pack", and "River Deep – Mountain High", among others.

Early years 
Eleanor Louise Greenwich was born in Brooklyn, New York to painter turned electrical engineer William Greenwich, a Catholic, and department store manager (later medical secretary), Rose Baron Greenwich, who was Jewish. Both parents were of Russian descent. She was not raised in either religion. She was reportedly named for Eleanor Roosevelt. Her musical interest was sparked as a child when her parents played music in their home and she listened to artists including Teresa Brewer, The Four Lads and Johnnie Ray, and she learned how to play the accordion at a young age. At age ten, she moved with her parents and younger sister, Laura, to suburban Levittown, New York.

By her teens, Greenwich was composing songs and said in a 1973 article, "When I was 14, I met Archie Bleyer who liked my songs but told me continue my education before trying to invade the songwriting jungle." At Levittown Memorial High School in Levittown, NY, Greenwich and two friends formed a singing group, The Jivettes, which took on more members and performed at local functions. While attending high school, she started using the accordion to write love songs about her school crush. After graduating high school, Greenwich applied to the Manhattan School of Music but was rejected because the school did not accept accordion players, and she subsequently enrolled at Queens College. Eventually she taught herself to compose on the piano rather than the accordion.

At 17, around the time she began attending Queens College, Greenwich recorded her first single for RCA Records, the self-written "Silly Isn't It", backed with "Cha-Cha Charming". The single was issued under the name "Ellie Gaye" (which she chose as a reference to Barbie Gaye, singer of the original version of "My Boy Lollipop"). However, a biography about Greenwich claimed that the name was changed by RCA Records to prevent mispronunciations of "Greenwich". "Cha-Cha Charming" was released in 1958 and indirectly led to her decision to transfer from Queens College to Hofstra University after one of her professors at the former institution belittled her for recording pop music.

Partnership with Jeff Barry

In 1959, still at college, Greenwich met the man who became her husband and main songwriting partner. Although it is possible they had been acquainted as children, since they shared a relative, the first time Greenwich and Jeff Barry met formally as adults was at a Thanksgiving dinner hosted by her maternal uncle, who was married to Barry's cousin. Greenwich and Barry recognized their mutual love of music. Barry was married at that time to his first wife, who was at the dinner, but he and Greenwich married several years later and became a songwriting duo recognized as one of the most successful and prolific among Brill Building composers.

Greenwich and Barry began dating after his marriage was annulled, but musically they continued separate careers. Still in college, in 1962, Greenwich got her first break in the business when she traveled to the Brill Building to meet John Gluck, Jr., one of the composers of the Lesley Gore hit "It's My Party". Needing to keep another appointment, Gluck installed Greenwich in an office and asked her to wait. The office turned out to be that of songwriter-producers Jerry Leiber and Mike Stoller. Hearing piano music from the cubicle, Leiber poked his head in and, expecting Carole King, was startled to see Greenwich, who introduced herself and explained her reasons for being there. Recognizing her potential as a songwriter, Leiber and Stoller agreed to allow her to use their facilities as she wished in exchange for first refusal on songs she wrote. They eventually signed Greenwich to their publishing company, Trio Music, as a staff songwriter.

Before marrying Barry, Greenwich wrote songs with different partners, including Ben Raleigh (co-writer on Barry's first hit as a composer, "Tell Laura I Love Her," in 1960) and Mark Barkan. She was also a session singer, recording so many demos that she became known as New York's Demo Queen. Her biggest hits during this period were written with Tony Powers. The Greenwich-Powers team made the charts with tunes such as "He's Got The Power" (The Exciters), "(Today I Met) The Boy I'm Gonna Marry" (Darlene Love), and "Why Do Lovers Break Each Others' Hearts?" (Bob B. Soxx & the Blue Jeans, with Love on lead vocal). These last two were co-written and produced by Phil Spector, who had been introduced to the songs, and to Greenwich, by music publisher Aaron Schroeder.

On October 28, 1962, Barry and Greenwich married, and shortly afterward decided to write songs exclusively with each other – a decision that disappointed Tony Powers as well as Barry's main writing partner, Artie Resnick. Barry was subsequently signed to Trinity Music, and he and Greenwich were given their own office with their names on the door. Before the end of 1963, Barry-Greenwich had scored hits with songs such as "Be My Baby" and "Baby, I Love You" (The Ronettes), "Then He Kissed Me" and "Da Doo Ron Ron" (The Crystals), "Not Too Young To Get Married" (Bob B. Soxx & the Blue Jeans), and "Christmas (Baby Please Come Home)" by Darlene Love, all co-written and produced by Phil Spector. Greenwich and Barry also recorded singles and an album under the name The Raindrops, with Greenwich providing all the female vocals through overdubbing, and Barry singing backgrounds in a bass voice. In addition to "What A Guy" (actually a demo, with Greenwich on piano and Barry on drums, sold to Jubilee Records and released as the first Raindrops single) and the U.S. Top 20 hit "The Kind Of Boy You Can't Forget," the couple wrote and recorded "Hanky Panky", which later became a hit for Tommy James and the Shondells in 1966 and, in 1964, "Do Wah Diddy Diddy", was taken to the No. 1 spot on the charts, in both the UK and the US, by Manfred Mann. Toward the end of 1963, the Raindrops recorded "That Boy John", a catchy fusion of jazz and rhythm and blues that reached the middle of the charts; President John F. Kennedy had just been assassinated and, according to Barry and Greenwich, radio stations were loath to play the song. Barry and Greenwich also penned songs for Connie Francis and in 1964 charted with two Lesley Gore hits, "Maybe I Know" and "Look of Love."

When Red Bird Records was founded in 1964 by Leiber and Stoller, Barry and Greenwich were brought in as songwriters and producers. The label's first release was The Dixie Cups' "Chapel of Love" (written with Phil Spector and originally recorded by The Ronettes), which sailed up the U.S. charts to No. 1. Barry and Greenwich continued to write and/or produce hits for Red Bird, including several other releases by The Dixie Cups ("People Say") as well as The Ad-Libs ("He Ain't No Angel" and "Remember"), The Jelly Beans ("I Wanna Love Him So Bad"), and The Shangri-Las ("Leader of the Pack"), co-written by George "Shadow" Morton. Morton, Barry and Greenwich penned "You Don't Know," which Greenwich recorded on Red Bird under her own name in 1965, at the same time Barry recorded and released another Barry–Greenwich tune, "Our Love Can Still Be Saved".

However, the couple's marriage could not be saved; before the end of the year, Barry and Greenwich divorced. The couple continued to work together for much of 1966, partly due to Greenwich's discovery of a talented singer-songwriter named Neil Diamond. Barry, Greenwich and Diamond joined to form Tallyrand Music to publish Diamond's songs. Diamond was subsequently signed to Bert Berns's Bang Records, and had a number of hits such as "Cherry Cherry" and "Kentucky Woman", all produced by Barry and Greenwich, who also sang backgrounds on many tracks. In addition, Barry and Greenwich teamed with Phil Spector one last time to pen "I Can Hear Music" and "River Deep - Mountain High". "I Can Hear Music" was recorded by The Ronettes in 1966 as their final single for the Philles label, and recorded by The Beach Boys in 1969. Spector produced "River Deep - Mountain High" for Ike and Tina Turner, although Ike was officially banned from the studio recording. Although "River Deep" peaked at No. 3 in the UK, the song was a commercial failure in the US, stalling at No. 88. A few years later, in 1970–71, The Supremes and The Four Tops had a No. 14 (U.S. charts) hit with their revival of "River Deep".

Later career
During 1967, Greenwich formed Pineywood Music with Mike Rashkow, and over the next few years the Greenwich-Rashkow team wrote and/or produced recordings for Greenwich herself as well as for Dusty Springfield, the Definitive Rock Chorale, the Other Voices, The Fuzzy Bunnies, and the Hardy Boys. Also in 1967, Greenwich recorded her first solo album, Ellie Greenwich Composes, Produces and Sings, released in 1968, which produced two chart hits, "Niki Hoeky" (#1 in Japan) and "I Want You to Be My Baby". Additionally, Greenwich continued to provide background vocals and vocal arrangements for diverse artists such as Dusty Springfield, Bobby Darin, Lou Christie and Frank Sinatra, as well as Electric Light Orchestra, Blondie, Cyndi Lauper and Gary U.S. Bonds. She did studio work for her ex-husband as well, singing backgrounds for Andy Kim, who was recording for Barry's Steed Records, and the Archies. 

At one such recording session, Greenwich met Steve Tudanger, with whom she and Steve Feldman would later form the company Jingle Habitat to write and produce jingles for radio and television. Tudanger and Feldman also co-produced Greenwich's second LP, Let It Be Written, Let It Be Sung, in 1973. Her song "Sunshine After the Rain" was a hit in the UK for singer Elkie Brooks. It was produced by Leiber and Stoller and taken from the Elkie Brooks album, Two Days Away. In 1976 Greenwich sang back-up for Debbie Harry on the song "In The Flesh" for Blondie's self-titled debut album "Blondie". After her partnership with Rashkow ended in 1971, Greenwich collaborated with writers such as Ellen Foley and Jeff Kent; the Greenwich-Kent-Foley team penned "Keep It Confidential", a hit for Nona Hendryx on the R&B charts in 1983. That same year, "Right Track Wrong Train", which Greenwich wrote with Kent and Cyndi Lauper, was the B-side of Cyndi's "Girls Just Wanna Have Fun", which hit No. 2 on the U.S. charts, and spent three weeks at Number One on the Australian charts.

Legacy
Greenwich's affiliation with Ellen Foley and Nona Hendryx indirectly led to a Broadway show that resurrected her 1960s music. When Foley and Hendryx performed at The Bottom Line cabaret in New York City, Greenwich was there to see them. The Bottom Line owner Allan Pepper convinced Greenwich to meet him and discuss putting together a revue showcasing her hits. In 1984, Leader of the Pack, a show based on Greenwich's life and music, opened at The Bottom Line. Greenwich appeared as herself in the second act, which focused on her early years in Long Island and her marriage and partnership with Barry. The show was revamped for Broadway and opened at the Ambassador Theatre the following year. Cast members included Greenwich, Darlene Love, Annie Golden, Dinah Manoff as young Ellie, and Patrick Cassidy as Jeff Barry. Leader of the Pack was nominated for a Tony Award for Best Musical and a Grammy Award for the cast album, and the play garnered The New York Music Critics' Award for Best Broadway Musical. During the 1990s and into the new millennium, the musical has enjoyed several revivals and continues to be performed at schools and community theaters. Leader of the Pack is still performed all over the world.

In 1991, Greenwich and Barry were inducted together into the Songwriters Hall of Fame. In 2004, Rolling Stone's list of the 500 greatest rock songs included six Greenwich-Barry compositions, more than any other non-performing songwriting team. In 1964 alone, the duo were responsible for writing 17 singles that reached the Billboard Hot 100 chart.

On December 15, 2009, The Rock and Roll Hall of Fame announced that Greenwich and Barry would receive the Ahmet Ertegun Award in March 2010 (which was posthumously awarded to Greenwich) for helping to define the Brill Building sound. At the ceremony at the Waldorf-Astoria, which was telecast on the Fuse TV cable network, Carole King inducted Greenwich, Barry, and other songwriting colleagues from the 1950s and early 1960s, including Barry Mann & Cynthia Weil, Otis Blackwell (also posthumously), Mort Shuman and Jesse Stone. Ellie's award was accepted by her sister Laura, while Barry's acceptance was read by Steve van Zandt.

On May 7, 2013, a "Garden of Ellie" that contains a statue of Greenwich was placed next to Hofstra University's music school. The sculpture was commissioned by Greenwich's family and created by Peter Homestead.

Death
On August 26, 2009, Greenwich died of a heart attack at St. Luke's-Roosevelt Hospital (now Mount Sinai West), New York City, where she had been admitted a few days earlier for treatment of pneumonia.

On September 20, 2009, Bruce Springsteen and the E Street Band dedicated "Da Doo Ron Ron" to Greenwich, while playing the song during a concert at the United Center, Chicago. Springsteen called Greenwich an "incredible rock and soul songwriter" before playing the song.

On February 3, 2010, Patti Smith dedicated an improvised cover of "Be My Baby" to Greenwich while playing a show on the Santa Monica Pier in California.

Discography

 The Raindrops by The Raindrops with Jeff Barry (1963)
 Ellie Greenwich Composes, Produces & Sings (1968)
 Let It Be Written, Let it Be Sung (1973)

Selected songs

References

Further reading
 Browne, David, "Ellie Greenwich: Brill Building Legend", Rolling Stone magazine, September 17, 2009, p. 43.
 Kreps, Daniel, "Be My Baby songwriter Ellie Greenwich dead at 68", Rolling Stone magazine, August 26, 2009.

External links
Ellie Greenwich at the Rock & Roll Hall Of Fame

 Ellie Greenwich – Daily Telegraph obituary
 – An Interview with the late Ellie Greenwich

1940 births
2009 deaths
20th-century American women singers
20th-century American women writers
21st-century American women singers
21st-century American women writers
American women pop singers
American women singer-songwriters
American people of Russian-Jewish descent
American women record producers
Bell Records artists
Broadway composers and lyricists
Hofstra University alumni
Jewish American songwriters
Musicians from Brooklyn
People from Levittown, New York
Record producers from New York (state)
Singer-songwriters from New York (state)
20th-century American singers
21st-century American singers
20th-century American Jews
21st-century American Jews